Bykovsky is a rural locality (a selo), the only inhabited locality, and the administrative center of Bykovsky Rural Okrug of Bulunsky District in the Sakha Republic, Russia, located  from Tiksi, the administrative center of the district. Its population as of the 2010 Census was 517, up from 363 recorded during the 2002 Census.

People from around Bykovskiy were among those who helped save some of the USS Jeannette survivors.

References

Notes

Sources
Official website of the Sakha Republic. Registry of the Administrative-Territorial Divisions of the Sakha Republic. Bulunsky District. 

Rural localities in Bulunsky District